The F. Scott Fitzgerald House, also known as Summit Terrace, in Saint Paul, Minnesota, United States, is part of a group of rowhouses designed by William H. Willcox and Clarence H. Johnston Sr.  The house, at 599 Summit Avenue, is listed as a National Historic Landmark for its association with author F. Scott Fitzgerald. The design of the houses was described as the "New York Style" in which unit was given a distinctive character found in some rowhouses in eastern cities.  Architecture critic Larry Millett describes it as "A brownstone row house that leaves no Victorian style unaccounted for, although the general flavor is Romanesque Revival."  The Fitzgerald house is faced with brownstone and is two bays wide with a polygonal two-story window bay on the right, and the entrance, recessed under a round arch that is flush with the bay front, on the left.  The mansard roof has a  cross-gable with two round-arch windows and decorative finials.

Fitzgerald's parents, Edward and Mollie, moved back to St. Paul in 1914 while F. Scott Fitzgerald was a student at Princeton University.  They lived in the unit at 593 Summit Avenue for a while, then moved to the 599 Summit Avenue unit in 1918.  In July and August 1919, Fitzgerald rewrote the manuscript that became his first novel, This Side of Paradise.  He lived here until January 1920, writing short stories, and then moved to New Orleans.  Of the several places the Fitzgeralds lived, this one is most closely associated with his literary fame, and typifies the environments of some of his later works.

It was declared a National Historic Landmark in 1971. It is also a contributing property to the Historic Hill District, listed in 1976.

F. Scott Fitzgerald was noted for disliking Summit Avenue, stating that Summit Avenue is “a mausoleum of American architectural monstrosities.”

See also
List of National Historic Landmarks in Minnesota
National Register of Historic Places listings in Ramsey County, Minnesota

References

External links

F. Scott Fitzgerald
Houses completed in 1889
Houses in Saint Paul, Minnesota
Houses on the National Register of Historic Places in Minnesota
Individually listed contributing properties to historic districts on the National Register in Minnesota
National Historic Landmarks in Minnesota
National Register of Historic Places in Saint Paul, Minnesota
Victorian architecture in Minnesota
Fitzgerald, F. Scott House